The original Walnut Lane Memorial Bridge was a prestressed concrete girder bridge in Philadelphia, Pennsylvania, designed by Belgian Engineer Gustave Magnel  and built by the City of Philadelphia.  Completed and fully opened to traffic in 1951, this three-span bridge carried Walnut Lane over Lincoln Drive and Monoshone Creek.  It was the first major prestressed concrete beam bridge designed and built in the United States when completed.

The form of the bridge was simple, and it looked similar to many highway bridges carrying traffic on US highways today.  The bridge deck was supported by thirteen concrete girders, each spanning .  These girders were prestressed by post-tensioning four wire cables embedded in the concrete.  Although this type of construction had been used in Europe for quite some time, the Walnut Lane Memorial Bridge was innovative in the United States and led to the successful application of this technology in this country.  The material-saving bridge cost about $700,000 to construct, about 30 percent cheaper than a regular concrete arch design.

The fascia (external) beams of the main span exhibited longitudinal cracks in about 1957. The other girders exhibited no cracks. Through the years, the cracks in the fascia beams were repaired and monitored. However, in 1989, the Pennsylvania Depart of Transportation made the decision to replace the bridge superstructure. Because of the historical significance of the structure, the decision was controversial. However, the replacement structure (the new Walnut Lane Memorial Bridge) comprises prestressed concrete girders and is similar in appearance to the original. The new bridge was completed in 1990.

A bronze plaque on the bridge's abutment reads:

A second plaque reads: "Outstanding Civil Engineering Achievement / Designated May 1978"

See also
List of bridges documented by the Historic American Engineering Record in Pennsylvania

References
Zollman, Charles C.; Depman, Frank; Nagle, Joseph; and Hollander, Edward F., "Building and Rebuilding of Philadelphia's Walnut Lane Memorial Bridge. Part 1: A History of Design, Construction, and Service Life," PCI Journal, V. 37, No. 3, May–June 1992, pp. 66–82.
Zollman, Charles C.; Depman, Frank; Nagle, Joseph; and Hollander, Edward F., "Building and Rebuilding of Philadelphia's Walnut Lane Memorial Bridge. Part 2: Demolition and Rebuilding of the Superstructure," PCI Journal, V. 37, No. 4, July–August 1992, pp. 64–82.
William H. Shank, "Historic Bridges of Pennsylvania", revised ed. (York, PA: American Canal & Transportation Center, 1980), pp. 3–4.
Newton Copp and Andrew Zanella, "A Balancing of Forces and Moments: The Walnut Lane Bridge", Discovery, Innovation, and Risk: Cade Studies in Science and Technology (Cambridge, MA: M.I.T. Press, 1993), pp. 200–214.

External links

Listing at Philadelphia Architects and Buildings

Bridges completed in 1950
Bridges in Philadelphia
Concrete bridges in the United States
Girder bridges in the United States
Historic American Engineering Record in Philadelphia
Philadelphia Register of Historic Places
Road bridges in Pennsylvania